Remus Glacier is a glacier, 8 nautical miles (15 km) long, which flows from the north slopes of Mount Lupa northwestward along the northeast side of the Blackwall Mountains into Providence Cove, Neny Fjord, on the west coast of Graham Land. The lower reaches of the glacier were first roughly surveyed in 1936 by the British Graham Land Expedition (BGLE) under Rymill. Resurveyed in 1948-49 by the Falkland Islands Dependencies Survey (FIDS), who so named it for its association with Romulus Glacier, whose head lies near the head of this glacier.

Further reading 
 Peter Gibbs, A memoir of time in the Antarctic 1956-59
 Jane G. Ferrigno, Alison J. Cook, Amy M. Mathie, Richard S. Williams, Jr., Charles Swithinbank, Kevin M. Foley, Adrian J. Fox, Janet W. Thomson, and Jörn Sievers, Coastal-Change and Glaciological Map of the Larsen Ice Shelf Area, Antarctica: 1940–2005, USGS

External links 

 Remus Glacier on USGS website
 Remus Glacier on SCAR website
 Current weather at Remus Glacier
 Long term updated weather forecast for Remus Glacier
 Historical weather data for Remus Glacier

References 

Glaciers of Fallières Coast